The United Roma Party of Kosovo (PREBK, PRYK) is a political party in Kosovo founded in 2000. It represents the interests of the Romani community in Kosovo.

Electoral history

At the 2004 parliamentary election, the party won 0.2% of the popular vote and 1 out of 120 seats in the Assembly of Kosovo, held by Zilfi Merdža.

In the 2017 elections Albert Kinoli won a seat in the assembly with the party gaining 955 votes for 0.13% of the vote. In 2018 the United Roma Party joined five other parties in demanding the resignation of Gjergj Dedaj, after he referred to Turkey and Serbia as “cruel rulers” who are seeking to regain their influence in Kosovo.

In the 2019 parliamentary election, the party won 0.12% of the popular vote and 1 seat in the assembly.

References

Political parties of minorities in Kosovo
Romani in Kosovo
Romani political parties